In aviation, icing conditions are atmospheric conditions that can lead to the formation of water ice on an aircraft. Ice accretion and accumulation can affect the external surfaces of an aircraft – in which case it is referred to as airframe icing – or the engine, resulting in carburetor icing, air inlet icing or more generically engine icing. These phenomena may possibly but do not necessarily occur together. Both airframe and engine icing have resulted in numerous fatal accidents in aviation history.

Not all aircraft, especially general aviation aircraft, are certified for flight into known icing (FIKI) – that is flying into areas with icing conditions certain or likely to exist, based on pilot reports, observations, and forecasts. In order to be FIKI-certified, aircraft must be fitted with suitable ice protection systems to prevent accidents by icing.

Definition
Icing conditions exist when the air contains droplets of supercooled liquid water. They freeze on contact with a potential nucleation site, which in this case is the parts of the aircraft, causing icing. Icing conditions are characterized quantitatively by the average droplet size, the liquid water content and the air temperature. These parameters affect the extent, type and speed that characterize the formation of ice on an aircraft. Federal Aviation Regulations contain a definition of icing conditions that some aircraft are certified to fly into. So-called SLD, or supercooled large droplet, conditions are those that exceed that specification and represent a particular hazard to aircraft, which all aircraft must try to avoid.

Qualitatively, pilot reports indicate icing conditions in terms of their effect upon the aircraft, and will be dependent upon the preexisting capabilities of the aircraft. Different aircraft may report the same quantitative conditions as different levels of icing as a result. Ice detectors are often used to indicate the presence of icing conditions.

Types of structural ice

Clear ice is often clear and smooth. Supercooled water droplets, or freezing rain, strike a surface but do not freeze instantly.  Often "horns" or protrusions are formed and project into the airflow, which smoothens it out. This form of ice is also called glaze.
Rime ice is rough and opaque, formed by supercooled drops rapidly freezing on impact. Forming mostly along an airfoil's stagnation point, it generally conforms to the shape of the airfoil.
Mixed ice is a combination of clear and rime ice, having both properties.
Frost ice is the result of water freezing on unprotected surfaces while the aircraft is stationary, before flight even starts.  This can be dangerous when flight is attempted because it disrupts an airfoil's boundary layer airflow causing a premature aerodynamic stall and, in some cases, dramatically increased drag making takeoff dangerous or impossible, which could lead to accidents prematurely.
SLD ice refers to ice formed in supercooled large droplet (SLD) conditions. It is similar to clear ice, but because droplet size is large, it extends to unprotected parts of the aircraft and forms larger ice shapes, faster than normal icing conditions, which nearly all aircraft isn't sufficiently protected from. This was a factor in the crash of American Eagle Flight 4184.

Effect

The wing will ordinarily stall at a lower angle of attack, and thus a higher airspeed, when contaminated with ice . Even small amounts of ice will have an effect, and if the ice is rough, it can be a large effect nonetheless. Thus an increase in approach speed is advisable if ice remains on the wings. How much of an increase depends on both the aircraft type and amount of ice. Stall characteristics of an aircraft with ice-contaminated wings will be degraded, and serious roll control problems are not unusual. The ice accretion may be asymmetric between the two wings which requires calibrating. Also, the outer part of a wing, which is ordinarily thinner and thus a better collector of ice, may stall first rather than last.

Icing prevention and removal
Several methods exist to reduce the dangers of icing, using ice protection systems. The first, and simplest, is to avoid icing conditions altogether, but for many flights this is not practical.

If ice (or other contaminants) are present on an aircraft prior to takeoff, they must be removed from critical surfaces. Removal can take many forms:
 Mechanical means, which may be as simple as using a broom or brush to remove snow
 Application of deicing fluid or even hot water to remove ice, snow, etc.
 Use of infrared heating to melt and remove contaminants
 Putting the aircraft into a heated hangar until snow and ice have melted
 Positioning aircraft towards the Sun to maximize heating up of snow and ice covered surfaces.  In practice this method is limited to thin contamination, by the time and weather conditions.
All of these methods remove existing contamination, but provide no practical protection in icing conditions. If icing conditions exist, or are expected before takeoff, then anti-icing fluids are used. These are thicker than deicing fluids and resist the effects of snow and rain for some time. They are intended to shear off the aircraft during takeoff and provide no inflight protection.

To protect an aircraft against icing in-flight, various forms of anti-icing or deicing are used:
 A common approach is to route engine "bleed air" into ducting along the leading edges of wings and tailplanes. The air heats the leading edge of the surface and this melts or evaporates ice on contact. On a turbine powered aircraft, air is extracted from the compressor section of the engine. If the aircraft is turbocharged piston powered, bleed air can be scavenged from the turbocharger.
 Some aircraft are equipped with pneumatic deicing boots that disperse ice build-up on the surface. These systems require less engine bleed air but are usually less effective than a heated surface.
 A few aircraft use a weeping wing system, which has hundreds of small holes in the leading edges and releases anti-icing fluid on demand to prevent the buildup of ice.
 Electrical heating is also used to protect aircraft and components (including propellers) against icing. The heating may be applied continuously (usually on small, critical, components, such as pitot static sensors and angle of attack vanes) or intermittently, giving an effect similar to the use of deicing boots.
In all these cases, usually only critical aircraft surfaces and components are protected. In particular, only the leading edge of a wing is usually protected.

Carburetor heat is applied to carbureted engines to prevent and clear icing. Fuel-injected engines are not susceptible to carburetor icing, but can suffer from blocked inlets. In these engines, an alternate air source is often available.

There is a difference between deicing and anti-icing. Deicing refers to the removal of ice from the airframe; anti-icing refers to the prevention of ice accumulating on the airframe.

Icing on unmanned aircraft 
Unmanned aircraft are an emerging technology with a large variety of commercial and military applications. In-flight icing occurs during flight in supercooled clouds or freezing precipitation and is a potential hazard to all aircraft. In-flight icing on UAVs imposes a major limitation on the operational envelope. 

Unmanned aircraft are more sensitive and susceptible to icing compared to manned aircraft. The main differences between UAVs and manned aircraft when it comes to icing are:

 Size and weight: Small aircraft accumulate ice faster, and more ice per unit area, compared to large aircraft. UAVs are typically smaller than manned aircraft and therefore more sensitive to icing. Furthermore, the added mass from ice accretions can have quick negative effects on UAVs with stringent weight restrictions.
 Flight velocity: High airspeeds lead to heating on the wings or propellers of the aircraft, which can counteract icing to some degree. UAVs fly at lower velocities than manned aircraft and will not benefit from the same heating effect. Therefore, icing on UAVs can occur at a broader range of temperatures than on manned aircraft.
 Laminar flow: The Reynolds number for UAVs is approximately an order of magnitude lower than that for manned aircraft. This leads to UAVs operating in flow regimes where laminar flow effects are more prevalent than turbulent flow effects. Because laminar flow is more easily disturbed than turbulent flow, the negative effects of icing are bigger.
 Type: Rotary-wing UAVs are typically more sensitive to icing than fixed-wing UAVs.

The parts of the UAV most exposed to icing are the airspeed sensor, the leading edge of aerodynamic surfaces, rotors, and propellers. 

Icing on UAVs is a global phenomenon, and icing conditions at the operational altitude can occur year round around the world. However, icing risks are particularly big in the sub arctics, Arctic and Antarctic. In large parts of the Nordics, for example, icing conditions are present from 35% to more than 80% of the time from September through May.

Accidents involving icing conditions

References

External links

 Aircraft Icing – NASA Page
 14 CFR 25 Appendix C – Atmospheric Icing Conditions for Aircraft Certification

Weather hazards to aircraft
Ice in transportation
Frost and rime